Banca del Territorio Lombardo is an Italian cooperative bank based in Pompiano, Lombardy.

In terms of branches, the bank is the second largest bank (as of 2016) among the Federazione Italiana delle Banche di Credito Cooperativo - Casse Rurali ed Artigiane (Federcasse), behind Banca di Credito Cooperativo di Roma.

Based on total assets (of 2014), the bank (in pro forma basis), was behind BCC Roma and Banca d'Alba among the member of Federcasse. According to the same research by Ricerche e Studi, BCC di Pompiano e della Franciacorta was ranked 51st among all types of banks, with BCC di Bedizzole Turano Valvestino was ranked the 165th. (despite some banks were omitted from the study). The bank was also the member of Federazione Lombarda delle Banche di Credito Cooperativo (4.15% stake in 2016). The bank also owned a minority interests in ICCREA Holding (1.64% in 2014).

History
Cassa Rurale di Depositi e Prestiti di Pompiano was found in 1919. The bank absorbed Cassa Rurale ed Artigiana di Roccafranca in 1976 and Cassa Rurale ed Artigiana di Castelcovati in 1994. In 1990s the bank was renamed as Banca di Credito Cooperativo di Pompiano e della Franciacorta. In 2016 the bank absorbed Banca di Credito Cooperativo di Bedizzole Turano Valvestino (found 1895).

See also

 Banco di Brescia
 Banca Credito Cooperativo di Brescia
 Banca Popolare di Brescia
 Cassa Padana
 Banca di Valle Camonica
 Banca Valsabbina

References

External links
  

Cooperative banks of Italy
Buildings and structures in the Province of Brescia
Companies based in Lombardy
Banks established in 1919
Italian companies established in 1919